Moses French Colby (July 2, 1795 – May 4, 1863) was a doctor and politician in Canada East.

He was born in Thornton, New Hampshire in 1795 but moved to Derby, Vermont with his family in 1798. He studied medicine with the local doctor there, then went on to further medical studies at Yale College and Dartmouth College. He returned to Derby to practice. In 1828, he studied anatomy at Harvard College. In 1832, after qualifying as a physician in Lower Canada, Colby moved to Stanstead. Besides practicing medicine, he also contributed to medical journals and produced his own remedies. He was elected to the Legislative Assembly of Lower Canada for Stanstead in an 1837 by-election and served until March 27, 1838, when the province was put under the rule of a special council after the Lower Canada Rebellion. He ran unsuccessfully in 1841 for a seat in the Legislative Assembly of the Province of Canada. In 1847, he was named surgeon for the local militia regiment. He died at Stanstead in 1863.

His son, Charles Carroll Colby, later represented Stanstead in the Canadian House of Commons.

External links 
 
The Colbys of Stanstead
The Colbys of Stanstead - Dr. Moses French Colby

1795 births
1863 deaths
Members of the Legislative Assembly of Lower Canada
Yale School of Medicine alumni
Geisel School of Medicine alumni
Harvard College alumni
People from Derby, Vermont